The 1994 Lehigh Engineers football team was an American football team that represented Lehigh University during the 1994 NCAA Division I-AA football season. Lehigh tied for second in the Patriot League. 

In their first year under head coach Kevin Higgins, the Engineers compiled a 5–5–1 record. Dan Gormsen and Sam Lawler were the team captains.

The Engineers were outscored 314 to 307. Their 3–2 conference record, however, tied for second place in the six-team Patriot League standings. 

Lehigh played its home games at Goodman Stadium on the university's Goodman Campus in Bethlehem, Pennsylvania.

Schedule

References

Lehigh
Lehigh Mountain Hawks football seasons
Lehigh Engineers football